Bainbridge Township is located in Schuyler County, Illinois. As of the 2010 census, its population was 639 and it contained 282 housing units.

Geography

Demographics

References

External links
 US Census
 Illinois State Archives

Townships in Schuyler County, Illinois
Townships in Illinois